The League of Communists of Vojvodina (SKV) was the Vojvodina branch of the League of Communists of Yugoslavia.

Party leaders 

Isa Jovanović (1943) (1906–1983)
Jovan Veselinov (1943 – 1946) (1907–1982)
Dobrivoje Vidić (1946 – May 1951) (1918–1991)
Stevan Doronjski (May 1951 – 1966) (1919–1981)
Mirko Tepavac (1966 – 1969) (1922–2014)
Mirko Čanadanović (1969 – 24 December 1972) (b. 1936)
Dušan Alimpić (24 December 1972 – 28 April 1981) (1921–2002)
Boško Krunić (28 April 1981 – 28 April 1982) (1929–2017)
Marko Đuričin (28 April 1982 – 28 April 1983) (1925–2013)
Slavko Veselinov (28 April 1983 – 28 April 1984) (1925–1997)
Boško Krunić (28 April 1984 – 24 April 1985) (1929–2017)
Đorđe Stojšić (24 April 1985 – 1988) (1928–2014)
Milovan Šogorov (1988 – 6 October 1988) (1941–2020)
Boško Kovačević (14 November 1988 – 20 January 1989) (b. 1946)
Nedeljko Šipovac (20 January 1989 – 16 July 1990) (b. 1942)

See also
History of Vojvodina
League of Communists of Yugoslavia
League of Communists of Bosnia and Herzegovina
League of Communists of Croatia
League of Communists of Macedonia
League of Communists of Montenegro
League of Communists of Serbia
League of Communists of Kosovo
League of Communists of Slovenia
List of leaders of communist Yugoslavia
Socialist Federal Republic of Yugoslavia

References

Political parties established in 1943
Parties of one-party systems
Political parties disestablished in 1990
Communist parties in Serbia
Defunct political parties in Serbia
League of Communists of Yugoslavia